Catochrysops is a genus of butterflies in the family Lycaenidae. The species of this genus are found in the Indomalayan and the Australasian realms.

Species
Listed alphabetically:
Catochrysops amasea Waterhouse & Lyell, 1914 Torres Strait Island, Rennell Island
Catochrysops lithargyria (Moore, 1877)
Catochrysops nubila Tite, 1959 Solomon Islands (Bougainville, Santa Isabel)
Catochrysops panormus (C. Felder, 1860)
Catochrysops strabo (Fabricius, 1793)
Catochrysops strabobinna Swinhoe, 1916 Lesser Sunda Islands, Celebes, Talaud, Tukangbesi, Sula, Maluku
Catochrysops taitensis (Boisduval, 1832) Fiji, New Hebrides

In some classifications, Catochrysops also includes Rysops as a monotypic subgenus.

References

 
Lycaenidae genera